Rissopsetia altispira is a species of sea snail, a marine gastropod mollusk in the family Pyramidellidae, the pyrams and their allies.

Distribution
This marine species occurs off New Caledonia and Western Australia

References

 Ponder W. 1974. A review of the Australian species assigned to Rissopsis Garrett with a description of a new species of Rissopsetia (Mollusca: Gastropoda). Journal of the Malacological Society of Australia, 3: 25-35
The Tibe Chrysallidini. ECIMAT (Estación de Ciencias Mariñas de Toralla) - Universidade de Vigo, 412 pp

External links
 To World Register of Marine Species

Pyramidellidae
Gastropods described in 1974